Michael Hart (born 10 February 1980) is a retired Scottish footballer who played as a right back for Aberdeen, Livingston, Preston North End, Hibernian, St Johnstone, Airdrie United and Huntly.

Career
Hart came through the ranks at Aberdeen and made his debut in a 1–1 draw with Dunfermline Athletic in 1998. He made a total of 19 first team appearances before moving on to Livingston on loan in 2000. His move to Livingston was made permanent in July 2001 and he helped them to a third-place finish in their first season in the SPL, which gave them qualification for the 2002–03 UEFA Cup.

Hart returned to Aberdeen in February 2003 and, after a shaky start, established himself as a fleet-footed, quick tackling right back. He missed most of the 2005–06 season due to a knee injury, featuring in only four matches. He came back into the team for the 2006–07 season and featured in almost every game, helping the club to a third-place finish in the league. In July 2007, Hart was involved in a car crash whilst on tour with Aberdeen in Egypt, along with team-mate Jamie Smith. Neither player was seriously hurt.

In January 2008, Hart signed a pre-contract agreement with Preston North End and was expected to move to Deepdale at the end of the season. However, on 31 January, Preston had an offer thought to be £100,000 accepted for the right-back. Hart then suffered from a succession of injuries, making only 25 appearances for Preston in over two years with the club. Preston manager Darren Ferguson listed Hart for transfer in May 2010.

Hart returned to Scotland in July 2010, with Hibernian, after his contract with Preston was cancelled. Hart's preferred position of right back had been a significant problem for Hibs during the previous season. He had been a target for Hibs manager John Hughes, who had been unable to sign him previously for "different reasons". Shortly after signing, Hart scored his first goal for 12 years and his first ever in club football, in a friendly against ADO Den Haag.

Hart suffered a serious groin injury in a friendly match against Sunderland in August 2011. He made a handful of appearances for Hibs in the 2011–12 season, before he was released from his contract by mutual consent on 31 January 2012.

Hart then signed for St Johnstone on a short-term contract until the end of the 2011–12 season. He joined Airdrie United in July 2012, but left in November the same year to pursue a full-time career outwith football.

Huntly signed Hart on 20 February 2013. But on 20 September 2013 Hart retired from football.

References

External links
Michael Hart player profile at pnefc.net

1980 births
Living people
Footballers from Bellshill
Scottish footballers
Association football defenders
Aberdeen F.C. players
Livingston F.C. players
Preston North End F.C. players
Hibernian F.C. players
Scottish Premier League players
Scottish Football League players
English Football League players
People educated at Holy Cross High School, Hamilton
St Johnstone F.C. players
Airdrieonians F.C. players
Huntly F.C. players
Highland Football League players